The Exchange with Rico Hizon (or simply The Exchange) is a CNN Philippines' late-evening business news program. The weekly show first aired on July 10, 2020.

The show is anchored by the network's Senior Anchor and Director for News Content Development, Rico Hizon. In 2020 Hizon was awarded Best TV Program Host at the Asian Academy Creative Awards for his work on The Exchange.

References

CNN Philippines original programming
2020 Philippine television series debuts